The RKK Energiya museum is a museum dedicated to the early achievements of Russian space exploration programmes. It is located on the grounds of the RKK Energiya factory in Korolyov, near Moscow. The date of the company founding is considered on August 26, 1946, when with the order of Dmitriy Ustinov as part of the Special Design Bureau of the NII-88 was formed, department No. 3 for the design of long-range missiles. Sergey Pavlovich Korolev was appointed chief designer department of 130 people. It was this department in 1951 that was transformed into OKB-1 - now RKK Energia. Since 1991, the corporation has the name of the chief designer Korolev.

Amongst the exhibits are the recovered capsule from the Vostok 1 mission with which Yuri Gagarin became the first man in space, the Vostok 6 capsule in which Valentina Tereshkova became the first woman in space, the Voskhod 2 capsule from which the first spacewalk was performed by Alexei Leonov, the Zond 5 capsule which carried two tortoises around the Moon in 1968, and the Soyuz 19 capsule used in the 1975 Apollo-Soyuz Test Project.

Exhibits
 Elektron 1
 Elektron 2
 Mir with Kvant module
 Molnya 1
 Luna 2
 Luna 3
 Luna 9
 Sputnik 2
 Sputnik 3
 Venera 3
 Voskhod 2
 Vostok 1
 Vostok 6
 Soyuz 19 (used in the Apollo–Soyuz Test Project)
 Soyuz 22
 Soyuz orbital module
 Soyuz TM control panel
 Spacesuits
 Zond 5

See also
Tsiolkovsky State Museum of the History of Cosmonautics
List of aerospace museums
National Air and Space Museum, United States equivalent museum

References

External links

 Official RKK Energiya site of the museum
 Photogallery

Aerospace museums in Russia
Museums in Moscow
RSC Energia